Mohamed Salim Mubarak (born 1968) is a footballer from the UAE who played as a defender for Al-Ahli Club in Dubai, and the UAE national football team. He was in the squad of UAE team in the 1990 FIFA World Cup in Italy but never played in the tournament.

References

1968 births
Living people
Emirati footballers
1984 AFC Asian Cup players
1988 AFC Asian Cup players
1990 FIFA World Cup players
Sportspeople from Dubai
United Arab Emirates international footballers
Al Ahli Club (Dubai) players
UAE Pro League players
Association football defenders